The World Junior Squash Circuit is the premier level for worldwide competition among under-19 junior squash players organised by the World Squash Federation. Mirroring the PSA and WSA circuits, the World Junior Circuit ranks players and every year is organized the World Junior Squash Championships.

Tournament Tiers

Just like the PSA, junior tournaments are divided into different levels. Tier 1 is the World Championships, Tier 2 : Regional Championships (e.g. European, Asian Junior Individual) + top level sub regionals such as British & US Junior Opens. And Tier 3 : All other sub regionals.

The point distribution for each level of tournaments is as follows:

Tournament List

Current junior world top 10 players

Boys U19

Girls U19

See also
 World Squash Federation
 World Junior Squash Championships
 PSA World Tour

References

External links
 Homepage World Squash Federation
 WSF World Junior Circuit Ranking

Squash tournaments
World Squash Federation

Sports competition series